Castillejos is an administrative neighborhood of Madrid located in the district of Tetuán.

References 

Wards of Madrid
Tetuán (Madrid)